Lek (Norwegian for 'play') is a softcore pornographic magazine published quarterly by MP House. The magazine was first published in 1971 and it contained erotic photos and stories. The magazine later moved to more pornographic content with pictures of amateur and professional models. Lek became increasingly popular after Linda Johansen became the magazine's editor in 1993.

Affiliated publications
 Lek Fetish with fetish pornography
 Lek special, with different topic in every issue
 Kontakt-forum, later Lek-forum, personal advertisements published since 1993.

References

External links
 Magazine homepage

1971 establishments in Norway
Magazines established in 1971
Magazines published in Norway
Monthly magazines published in Norway
Norwegian-language magazines
Pornographic magazines